is a member of the House of Councillors of Japan from Hokkaido. He belongs to the Liberal Democratic Party (LDP). In 1990 he enrolled at Hokkaido University and majored in Business Administration. While attending university, he, with five other friends, brought the Soran Festival to Hokkaido, which is now run by the Yasakoi Soran Festival Foundation.  The Soran Festival incorporates the traditional Sōran Bushi song and dance. In 1998 he was elected Director of the Yasakoi Soran Foundation.　　He has received the Japan Event New Theme Prize, the Suntory Area Culture Prize, and the Japanese Lifestyle and Culture Prize, for his founding of the Yasakoi Soran Bushi Festival that has come to represent the city of Sapporo. In 2008 he ran against Takahiro Yokomichi of the Democratic Party of Japan for representative of the first district of Hokkaido. He came in second place with a total of 124,343 votes. . He was elected to the House of Councillors in July 2010.

References

External links 
 
 Blog

1971 births
Living people
People from Kasugai, Aichi
Hokkaido University alumni
Members of the House of Councillors (Japan)
Liberal Democratic Party (Japan) politicians